Thelyphonus is the type genus of whip scorpions or 'vinegaroons' in the subfamily Thelyphoninae, with species found in Southeast Asia.

Species
, the World Uropygi Catalog accepts the following forty-five species:

 Thelyphonus ambonensis (Speijer, 1933) – Indonesia
 Thelyphonus angustus Lucas, 1835 – unknown
 Thelyphonus anthracinus Pocock, 1894 – Malaysia
 Thelyphonus asperatus Thorell, 1888 – Indonesia
 Thelyphonus billitonensis Speijer, 1931 – Indonesia
 Thelyphonus borneensis Kraepelin, 1897 – Borneo
 Thelyphonus borneonus Haupt, 2009 – Borneo
 Thelyphonus burchardi Kraepelin, 1911 – Indonesia
 Thelyphonus caudatus (Linnaeus, 1758) – Vietnam, Indonesia
 Thelyphonus celebensis Kraepelin, 1897 – Indonesia
 Thelyphonus dammermanni (Speijer, 1933) – Indonesia
 Thelyphonus dicranotarsalis (Rowland, 1973) – Papua New Guinea
 Thelyphonus doriae Thorell, 1888 – Malaysia
 Thelyphonus feuerborni Werner, 1932 – Java
 Thelyphonus florensis (Speijer, 1933) – Indonesia
 Thelyphonus gertschi (Rowland, 1973) – Papua New Guinea
 Thelyphonus grandis Speijer, 1931 – Borneo
 Thelyphonus hansenii Kraeplein, 1897 – Philippines
 Thelyphonus insulanus L.Koch & Keyserling, 1885 – Fiji
 Thelyphonus kinabaluensis Speijer, 1933 – Malaysia
 Thelyphonus klugii Kraepelin, 1897 – Indonesia
 Thelyphonus kopsteini (Speijer, 1933) – Indonesia
 Thelyphonus kraepelini Speijer, 1931 – Indonesia
 Thelyphonus lawrencei Rowland, 1973 – Solomon Islands
 Thelyphonus leucurus Pocock, 1898 – Solomons
 Thelyphonus linganus C.L.Koch, 1843 – Indonesia, Malaysia
 Thelyphonus lucanoides Butler, 1872 – Indonesia, Sarawak
 Thelyphonus luzonicus Haupt, 2009 – Philippines
 Thelyphonus manilanus C.L. Koch, 1843 – Indonesia, Papua New Guinea, Philippines, Thailand
 Thelyphonus nasutus (Thorell, 1888) – Borneo
 Thelyphonus pococki Tarnani, 1900 – Indonesia
 Thelyphonus renschi (Speijer, 1936) – Borneo
 Thelyphonus rohdei (Kraepelin, 1897) – Indonesia, Papua New Guinea
 Thelyphonus samoanus (Kraepelin, 1897) – Samoa
 Thelyphonus schnehagenii Kraepelin, 1897 – Burma
 Thelyphonus semperi Kraepelin, 1897 – Philippines
 Thelyphonus sepiaris Butler, 1873 – India, Sri Lanka
 Thelyphonus seticauda Doleschall, 1857 – Indonesia, Philippines
 Thelyphonus spinimanus Lucas, 1835 – unknown
 Thelyphonus suckii Kraepelin, 1897 – Indonesia
 Thelyphonus sumatranus Kraepelin, 1897 – Indonesia
 Thelyphonus tarnanii Pocock, 1894 – Sumatra
 Thelyphonus vanoorti Speijer, 1936 – Philippines
 Thelyphonus wayi Pocock, 1900 – Cambodia
 Thelyphonus willeyi (Pocock, 1898) – Papua New Guinea

References

External Links & See Also
 List of Thelyphonidae species (includes fossil taxa)
 

Arachnid genera
Uropygi
Arachnids of Asia